The Cypriot Second Division is the second highest football division of the Cypriot football league system. Administrated by the Cyprus Football Association, it is contested by 16 teams, with the top two teams being promoted to the Cypriot First Division and the last four teams being relegated to the Cypriot Third Division.

History
The Cypriot Second Division started unofficially the 1934–35 football season as the second level of the Cypriot football (Cyprus Football Association founded in 1934). The competition consisted of teams that didn't participate in Cypriot First Division and the reserve teams of the Cypriot First Division clubs. In the reserve teams were allowed to participate only players that had no more than three caps with their team in First Division. The reserve teams managed to win all the titles of the unofficial period.

The first official second division championship was held in the 1953–54 season, after the unification of Cypriot Football, without the presence of the reserve teams. From that season, the reserve teams were participate in the new Reserve Teams Championship.

Almost every team that participated and still participate in the Cypriot First Division had also participated in the Second Division, with only exceptions to be APOEL and Omonia. Pezoporikos Larnaca and Trust were also two teams that never played to Second Division but both do not exist anymore. Çetinkaya Türk also never participated in Second Division but the team withdrew from CFA in 1954. Many teams with multiple participations in the Cypriot First Division had also played in the Second Division, like AEL Limassol, Nea Salamis Famagusta, Apollon Limassol, Olympiakos Nicosia, AEK Larnaca, Enosis Neon Paralimni and EPA Larnaca.

Anorthosis Famagusta also participated in the Second Division during 1945–46 season (unofficial competition), because they withdrew from CFA eight years earlier and disbanded their football team. After their reform and their re-integration in the CFA, they were forced to play in the Second Division in order to be promoted to the First Division. It was the only time from the unofficial period of the competition that a team promoted from the Second Division to the First Division.

Since 1952–53 season, the second Division teams took part in the Cypriot Cup, except of the 1963–64 season. In some seasons during the 1960s and 1970s only the leading teams of the Second Division took part (some times only the champion) in the competition. From 1975–76 season all the teams of the Cypriot Second Division take part in the Cypriot Cup. No Second Division team ever reach the final but they managed to qualify to the semi-finals four times (Nea Salamis Famagusta in 1953–54, Orfeas Nicosia in 1983–84, PAEEK in 1984–85 and AEP Paphos in 2005–06).

Structure
The structure of the championship was changed some times. From 1953–54 until 1967–68 the championship was split to two or three geographical groups, depending from Districts of Cyprus each participated team came from. The winners of each group were playing against each other in the final phase of the competition and the winner were the champions of the Second Division.

The championship was held for the first time as a single division in the 1968–69 season. All the teams played against each other twice, once at their home and once away. The team with the most points at the end of the season crowned champions. This is the league's current format until present time. Exceptions were:
 The 1974–75 season, due to the Turkish invasion of Cyprus which forced many teams that had their headquarters to the north Cyprus to be closed temporarily or permanently, CFA decided to have a Special mixed championship of Second & Third Division. In this championship could participate all the teams of the Second and Third Division. Participation was optional. The championship had two geographical groups. The winners of each group were playing against each other in the final phase and the winners were the champions of the league. The winner was considered as the 1974–75 Cypriot Second Division champions.
 The 1994–95 season, the league consisted of three rounds. In the first two rounds all teams played against each other twice, once at their home and once away. The home teams for the third round matches were determined based on their league table position after the end of the second round.
 The 2009–10, 2010–11, 2011–12 and 2012–13 seasons, each team played against each other twice, once at home and once away. After these matches, the first four teams qualified for the Promotion Group. At the Promotion Group every team played each other twice, once at home and once away. The teams with the best records were promoted to First Division. Regular season records were carried over without any modifications.
 The 2013–14 season, the league was split into a two tier system, Group B1 and Group B2 with 8 teams participating in each division. All the teams played (of each group) against each other four times, twice at home and twice away. The first two teams of Group B1 were promoted to the Cypriot First Division, while the first two teams of Group B2 were promoted to Group B1. The last four teams of Group B1 were relegated to Group B2, while the last four teams of Group B2 were relegated to the Cypriot Third Division. However, after the end of the season Cyprus Football Association merged the two groups, creating a unified Second Division. So all the teams that were relegated from B1 to B2 and the teams that promoted from B2 to B1 participated in the new unified Second Division. The two groups were not at the same level, as Group B1 was above Group B2. Second Division Champions of that season was considered the winner of Group B1.

Current format (Since 2018–19)
Sixteen clubs are competing in the league, playing each other twice, once at home and once away for a total of 30 games per team. The champion and the second place team are promoted to the Cypriot First Division and the bottom four are relegated to the Cypriot Third Division.

Points system
The points system of the Cypriot Second Division changed three times during the years:
From 1953–54 until 1959–60 season, teams were awarded two points for a win, one point for a draw and zero points for a defeat. From 1960–61 until 1969–70 season, teams were awarded three points for a win, two points for a draw and one point for a defeat. From 1970–71 until 1990–91 season, teams were awarded two points for a win, one point for a draw and zero points for a defeat. Since 1991–92 season (until present time), teams are awarded three points for a win, one point for a draw and zero points for a defeat.

Teams
The 16 teams which participate in the 2022–23 Cypriot Second Division are:

 AEZ Zakakiou
 Alki Oroklini
 ALS Omonia 29M
 Anagennisi Deryneia
 AO Ayia Napa
 ENY Digenis Ypsona changes its name to FC Krasava since 2022
 Ethnikos Achna
 Ermis Aradippou
 MEAP Nisou
 Othellos Athienou
 Olympias Lympion
 Omonia Aradippou
 Onisilos Sotira
 P.O. Xylotymbou
 PAEEK
 Peyia 2014

Winners (unofficial competition: 1935–1953)
The table presents the winners of the competition during the period 1935–1953, in which the competition was unofficial. During that period, the league consisted of the reserve teams of the Cypriot First Division clubs (which managed to win all the titles) and other teams that didn't participate in the First Division.

The period 1941–1944 the championship was not held due to World War II. Many Cypriots were volunteer enlisted in the Greek and English army, and also formed a Cypriot constitution. Most teams have undertaken national project by collecting money and clothing to be sent to Greece in order to assist the Greek people and the army. Moreover, many Greek refugees fled to Cyprus. Due to the prevailed war conditions the CFA decided to suspend all the competitions.

Winners
The table presents all the winners since the 1953–54 season, in which the competition started officially.

Performance By Club

Number of participating and promoted teams per season
The number of the participated teams and the number of the teams that were promoted to the Cypriot First Division was changed many times during the years. In some seasons no team was promoted, in other seasons only the champion was promoted and some other seasons were promoted the first two or the first three teams. In some seasons, play-offs between a First Division and a Second Division team were held with the winner participating in the next season's First Division and the losing team in the Second Division.

Participations per club
So far, 87 teams participated in the Cypriot Second Division since 1953–54 (including the 2017–18 season).

1The team has 15 participations as PAEK, 3 participations as PAEK/AEK and 28 participations as PAEEK.
2The team has some participations as Enosis-Keravnos.
3The team has 3 participations as APEP Limassol and 18 participations as APEP Pitsilias.

League or status at 2017–18:

See also
 Football in Cyprus
 Cypriot football league system
 Cypriot First Division
 Cypriot Third Division
 STOK Elite Division
 Cypriot Cup

References

Sources

External links
 Cyprus Football Association

 
2
Second level football leagues in Europe